Holsey is a surname. Notable people with the surname include:

Bernard Holsey (born 1973), American football player
Frog Holsey (1906–?), American baseball pitcher
Hopkins Holsey (1779–1856), American politician
Joshua Holsey (born 1994), American football player
Monique Holsey-Hyman, American politician, social worker, and academic

See also
Hosley